Leucorrhinia frigida, the frosted whiteface, is a species of dragonfly in the family Libellulidae. It is found in northeastern United States and southern Manitoba, Ontario, Quebec, and New Brunswick.

References

 Leucorrhinia frigida, Discover Life

External links
 Frosted whiteface, PBase
 Leucorrhinia frigida, Encyclopedia of Life

Libellulidae
Taxa named by Hermann August Hagen
Insects described in 1890